The following is the guest list for the wedding of Prince William and Catherine Middleton.

Relatives of the groom

House of Windsor
 The Queen and The Duke of Edinburgh, the groom's paternal grandparents
 The Prince of Wales and The Princess of Wales, the groom's father and mother
 Prince Henry of Wales, the groom's brother
 The Princess Royal and Vice Admiral Sir Timothy Laurence, the groom's paternal aunt and uncle
 Peter and Autumn Phillips, the groom's first cousin and his wife
 Zara Phillips and Mike Tindall, the groom's first cousin and her fiancé
 The Duke of York, the groom's paternal uncle
 Princess Beatrice of York, the groom's first cousin
 Princess Eugenie of York, the groom's first cousin
 The Earl and Countess of Wessex, the groom's paternal uncle and aunt
 Lady Louise Mountbatten-Windsor, the groom's first cousin
The Princess Margaret, Countess of Snowdon's family:
 Viscount and Viscountess Linley, the groom's first cousin, once removed, and his wife
 The Hon. Charles Armstrong-Jones, the groom's second cousin
 The Hon. Margarita Armstrong-Jones, the groom's second cousin
 Lady Sarah and Daniel Chatto, the groom's first cousin, once removed, and her husband
 Samuel Chatto, the groom's second cousin
 Arthur Chatto, the groom's second cousin

Other descendants of the Prince's great-great-grandfather King George V and their families:
 The Duke and Duchess of Gloucester, the groom's first cousin, twice removed and his wife
 The Earl and Countess of Ulster, the groom's second cousin, once removed, and his wife
 Lady Davina and Gary Lewis, the groom's second cousin, once removed, and her husband
 Lady Rose and George Gilman, the groom's second cousin, once removed, and her husband
 The Duke and Duchess of Kent, the groom's first cousin, twice removed and his wife
 The Earl and Countess of St Andrews, the groom's second cousin, once removed, and his wife
 Lord Downpatrick, the groom's third cousin
 Lady Marina-Charlotte Windsor, the groom's third cousin
 Lady Amelia Windsor, the groom's third cousin
 Lady Helen and Timothy Taylor, the groom's second cousin, once removed, and her husband
 Lord and Lady Nicholas Windsor, the groom's second cousin, once removed, and his wife
 Princess Alexandra, The Hon. Lady Ogilvy, the groom's godmother and first cousin, twice removed
 James and Julia Ogilvy, the groom's second cousin, once removed, and his wife
 Marina Ogilvy, the groom's second cousin, once removed
 Prince and Princess Michael of Kent, the groom's first cousin, twice removed and his wife
 Lord and Lady Frederick Windsor, the groom's second cousin, once removed, and his wife
 Lady Gabriella Windsor, the groom's second cousin, once removed

Other descendants of Queen Victoria
Other descendants of the prince's great-great-great-great-grandmother Queen Victoria and their families. As is common in royalty, there has been slight intermingling of families. Where possible, the closest family title has been noted (first cousin on grandfather's side, instead of third cousin on grandmother's side, etc.):
  The Queen of Denmark, the groom's third cousin, twice removed
  The Crown Princess of Sweden and The Duke of Västergötland, the groom's fourth cousin, once removed, and her husband (representing the King of Sweden)
  The King and Queen of Norway the groom's second cousin, twice removed and his wife
  The Queen of Spain the groom's second cousin, once removed (representing the King of Spain)
  The Prince and Princess of Asturias the groom's third cousin and his wife
 The Margrave and Margravine of Baden, the groom's first cousin once removed, and his wife
 Princess Margarita of Baden, the groom's first cousin, once removed
 King Constantine II and Queen Anne-Marie of the Hellenes, the groom's second cousin, once removed, and third cousin, once removed (King Constantine is also Prince William's godfather)
 Crown Prince Pavlos and Crown Princess Marie-Chantal of Greece, the groom's third cousin and his wife
 Prince Constantine Alexios of Greece and Denmark, the groom's third cousin, once removed (and godson)
 King Michael I of Romania, the groom's second cousin, once removed
 Crown Princess Margareta of Romania the groom's third cousin
 Crown Prince Alexander and Crown Princess Katherine of Yugoslavia, the groom's third cousin and his wife
 The Landgrave of Hesse the groom's third cousin, twice removed
 Prince and Princess Karl of Hesse, the groom's first cousin, once removed, and his wife
 Princess Irina, Countess of Schönburg-Glauchau, the groom's second cousin
 The Prince and Princess of Hohenlohe-Langenburg, the groom's second cousin
 Princess Xenia and Mr Max Soltmann, the groom's second cousin and her husband
 The Lady Saltoun,  widow of the groom's second cousin, thrice removed
 The Countess Mountbatten of Burma, the groom's first cousin, twice removed
 The Lord Brabourne, the groom's second cousin, once removed (and godfather)
Lady Pamela Hicks, the groom's first cousin, twice removed

Bowes-Lyon Family
 The Hon. Margaret Rhodes, the groom's first cousin, twice removed
 Lady Elizabeth Shakerley, the groom's second cousin, once removed

Spencer family
 Lady Sarah and Neil McCorquodale, the groom's maternal aunt and uncle
 Emily McCorquodale, the groom's first cousin
 George McCorquodale, the groom's first cousin
 Celia McCorquodale, the groom's first cousin
 The Lady and Lord Fellowes, the groom's maternal aunt and uncle
 The Hon. Laura Pettman, the groom's first cousin
 The Hon. Alexander Fellowes, the groom's first cousin
 The Hon. Eleanor Fellowes, the groom's first cousin
 The Earl Spencer and Karen Gordon, the groom's maternal uncle and his wife
Lady Kitty Spencer, the groom's first cousin Lady Eliza Spencer, the groom's first cousin Lady Amelia Spencer, the groom's first cousin Viscount Althorp, the groom's first cousin Lady Anne Wake-Walker, the groom's maternal great-aunt Mr and Mrs Anthony Duckworth-Chad, the groom's first cousin, once removed, and her husband Davina Duckworth-Chad  and Tom Barber, the groom's second cousin and her husbandRoche family
 The Hon. Mary Roche, the groom's maternal great-aunt The Lord and Lady Fermoy, the groom's first cousin, once removed, and his wifeParker Bowles family
Andrew Parker Bowles, father of the groom's stepbrother and stepsisterTom and Sara Parker Bowles, the groom's stepbrother and stepsister-in-lawLaura and Harry Lopes, the groom's stepsister and stepbrother-in-lawBen Elliot, the groom's step-first cousinRelatives of the bride

Michael and Carole Middleton, the bride's parentsPippa Middleton and Mr Alex Loudon, the bride's sister and her guest James Middleton, the bride's brother Gary and Luan Goldsmith, the bride's maternal uncle and his ex-wife Tallulah Goldsmith, the bride's first cousin Richard Middleton, the bride's paternal uncle Nicholas Middleton, the bride's paternal uncle Simon Middleton, the bride's paternal uncle Adam Middleton, the bride's first cousin Lucy Middleton, the bride's first cousin Anne Gabriella Middleton, the bride's first cousin Matita Glassborow  the bride's first cousin, once removed; great grandniece of Dame Ellen Terry
 Dr Penny Barton, the bride's first cousin, once removed David Middleton
 Elizabeth Middleton
 Timothy Middleton
 John Middleton
 Jean Harrison
 Stephen Lupton

Foreign royalty
Members of reigning royal families
  The Duke and Duchess of Brabant (representing The King of the Belgians) The Duke is Prince William's fourth cousin through Christian IX of Denmark  The King of Bhutan
  The Sultan and Raja Isteri of Brunei
  Sheikh Ahmad Hamoud Al-Sabah (representing the Emir of Kuwait) 
  Prince Seeiso and Princess Mabereng of Lesotho (representing The King of Lesotho)
  The Grand Duke and Grand Duchess of Luxembourg The Grand Duke is Prince William's fourth cousin through Christian IX of Denmark  The King and Queen of Malaysia
  The Prince of Monaco and fiancée Charlene Wittstock
  Princess Lalla Salma of Morocco (representing The King of Morocco) 
  The Prince of Orange and Princess Máxima of the Netherlands (representing The Queen of the Netherlands) The Prince is Prince William's fifth cousin once removed through Paul I of Russia  Prince Sayyid Haitham bin Tariq Al Said of Oman (representing the Sultan of Oman) 
  The Emir of Qatar and Sheika Mozah
  Prince Mohamed bin Nawaf and  his wife Princess Fadwa of Saudi Arabia (representing the King of Saudi Arabia; Prince Mohammed is Saudi Arabian Ambassador to the United Kingdom)

  The King of Swaziland
  Princess Maha Chakri Sirindhorn of Thailand (representing The King of Thailand)
  The King of Tonga
  The Crown Prince of Abu Dhabi (representing the President of the United Arab Emirates) 

Members of non-reigning royal families
 King Simeon II and Queen Margarita of the Bulgarians, the King and Prince William are four times fourth cousins three times removed, sharing Francis, Duke of Saxe-Coburg-Saalfeld as their common ancestor Princess Elizabeth of Yugoslavia, the groom's second cousin once removedCommonwealth
Commonwealth Governors-General
  Sir Patrick Allen ON GCMG CD (Governor-General of Jamaica)
  Sir Frederick Ballantyne GCMG (Governor-General of Saint Vincent and the Grenadines) and Lady Ballantyne
  Dame Quentin Bryce AD CVO  (Governor-General of Australia) and Michael Bryce AM AE
  Sir Arthur Foulkes GCMG (Governor-General of the Bahamas) and Lady Foulkes
  Sir Clifford Husbands GCMG KA QC (Governor-General of Barbados)
  David Johnston  (Governor General of Canada) and Sharon Johnston  PhD
  Sir Frank Kabui GCMG CSI OBE (Governor-General of the Solomon Islands) and Lady Kabui
  Dame Pearlette Louisy GCMG (Governor-General of Saint Lucia)
  Sir Michael Ogio GCMG CBE (Governor-General of Papua New Guinea) and Lady Ogio
  Sir Anand Satyanand GNZM QSO (Governor-General of New Zealand) and Lady Satyanand
  Sir Cuthbert Sebastian GCMG OBE (Governor-General of Saint Kitts and Nevis)
  Dame Louise Lake-Tack GCMG DStJ (Governor-General of Antigua and Barbuda)
  Sir Colville Young GCMG MBE (Governor-General of Belize) and Lady Young

Prime Ministers of Commonwealth realms
  David Cameron (Prime Minister of the United Kingdom) and Samantha Cameron
  Julia Gillard (Prime Minister of Australia) with her partner Tim Mathieson
  Ralph Gonsalves (Prime Minister of Saint Vincent and the Grenadines) and Eloise Gonsalves
  Hubert Ingraham (Prime Minister of the Bahamas) and Delores Miller
  John Key (Prime Minister of New Zealand) and Bronagh Key
  Stephenson King (Prime Minister of Saint Lucia) and Rosella Nestor
  Freundel Stuart (Prime Minister of Barbados)

Politicians and diplomats
Ambassadors to the United Kingdom
   (German ambassador)
  Alain Giorgio Maria Economides (Italian ambassador)
  Bernard Émié (French ambassador)
  Keiichi Hayashi (Japanese ambassador)
  Ja Song-nam (North Korean ambassador)
  Nalin Surie (Indian High Commissioner)
  Ron Prosor (Israeli Ambassador)
   (Dutch ambassador)
  Wajid Shamsul Hasan (Pakistani ambassador)
  Louis Susman (United States ambassador)
  Barbara Tuge-Erecinska (Polish Ambassador)

Lieutenant Governors of the Crown Dependencies
  Lt General Andrew Ridgway (Lieutenant Governor of Jersey)
  Adam Wood (Lieutenant Governor of the Isle of Man)

Delegates from the British Overseas Territories
  McKeeva Bush OBE (Premier of the Cayman Islands) and Kerry Bush
  Peter Caruana QC (Chief Minister of Gibraltar) and Cristina Caruana
  Paula Cox (Premier of Bermuda) and Germain Nkeuleu
  John Cranfield (Saint Helena) and Vilma Cranfield
  Sharon Halford (member of the Legislative Assembly of the Falkland Islands) and Rodney Halford
  Reuben Meade (Chief Minister of Montserrat) and the Revd Dr Joan Delsol Meade
  Ralph T. O'Neal OBE (Premier of the British Virgin Islands) and the Revd Edris O'Neal

Other dignitaries from within Great Britain and Northern Ireland
 The Lord Mayor of the City of London, Michael Bear and Barbara Bear
Richard Benyon (British Conservative MP for Newbury) and Zoe Benyon
John Bercow (Speaker of the House of Commons) and Sally Bercow
Kenneth Clarke PC, QC  (Lord High Chancellor of Great Britain and Secretary of State for Justice) and Gillian Clarke
Nick Clegg (Lord President of the Council and Deputy Prime Minister of the United Kingdom) and Miriam Clegg
Lord Elis-Thomas (Presiding Officer of the National Assembly for Wales) and Lady Elis-Thomas
Alex Fergusson (Presiding Officer of the Scottish Parliament) and Merryn Fergusson
Simon Fraser CMG (British Permanent Secretary of the Foreign and Commonwealth Office) with his wife 
William Hague (British Secretary of State for Foreign and Commonwealth Affairs and First Secretary of State) and Ffion Hague
Alderman William Hay (Speaker of the Northern Ireland Assembly) and his wife Ffion Jenkins
Helene Hayman, Baroness Hayman GBE, PC (Lord Speaker of the House of Lords) and Martin Hayman
Jeremy Hunt PC (British Secretary of State for Culture, Olympics, Media and Sport) and Lucia Chen
The Lord Hurd of Westwell (Douglas Hurd)  (former Foreign and Home Secretary)
Boris Johnson (Mayor of London) and Marina Wheeler
Carwyn Jones (First Minister of Wales) and Lisa Jones
 Sir John Major (Former Conservative Prime Minister 1990–1997) KG CH PC and Dame Norma Major DBE
Theresa May (British Home Secretary and Minister for Women and Equalities) and Philip May
Ed Miliband (British Leader of the Opposition and Leader of the Labour Party) and Justine Thornton
 Sir Gus O'Donnell KCB (British Cabinet Secretary) and Lady O'Donnell
George Osborne (British Chancellor of the Exchequer) and his wife Frances Osborne
Peter Robinson (First Minister of Northern Ireland)
Alex Salmond (First Minister of Scotland) and Moira Salmond
The Lord Mayor of Westminster, Judith Warner with Count Paolo Filo della Torre

British armed forces
Major Tom Archer-Burton (Prince William's Commanding Officer in the Household Cavalry)
 Major William Bartle-Jones (Prince William's Squadron Leader in the Household Cavalry Regiment based at Windsor)
Lance-Corporal Martyn Compton (Household Cavalry, injured in an ambush in Afghanistan in 2006)
Rear Admiral Ian Corder (Royal Navy Submarine Service; Prince William was appointed Commodore-in-Chief of Submarines)
 The Irish Guards. Captain James Parke and his wife Elaine.
Major-General William Cubitt (Major-General Commanding the Household Division and General Officer Commanding London District) and Lucy Cubitt
Air Chief Marshal Sir Stephen Dalton (Chief of the Air Staff) and Lady Dalton
 Holly Dyer (sister of 2nd Lieutenant Joanna Dyer, who was killed by a bomb in Iraq in 2007. Joanna Dyer had been a close friend of Prince William's at Sandhurst)
Captain Mark Hayhurst (a friend of Prince William's) and his fiancée, Elizabeth Sebag-Montefiore
General Sir Nicholas Houghton (Vice-Chief of the Defence Staff) and Lady Houghton
Captain Harry Legge-Bourke, Welsh Guards officer (brother of Tiggy Legge-Bourke) and Iona Legge-Bourke, as well as his mother, Dame Elizabeth Shân Legge-Bourke
Air Vice Marshal David Murray (Defence Services Secretary) with his wife
General Sir David Richards (Chief of the Defence Staff) and Lady Richards
 Susie Roberts (widow of Major Alexis Roberts, who was killed in Afghanistan in 2007. Alexis Roberts was Prince William's Platoon Commander at Sandhurst)
Brigadier Edward Smyth-Osbourne (Prince William's Commanding Officer in the Household Cavalry Regiment and military mentor)
Admiral Sir Mark Stanhope (First Sea Lord and Chief of the Naval Staff) and Lady Stanhope
General Sir Peter Wall (Chief of the General Staff) and Lady Wall
 Bryn and Emma Parry (founders of Help for Heroes)
Wing Commander Kevin Marsh (met Prince William through his service in the RAF)
Squadron Leader Craig Finch (Principal instructor to Prince William during his time with the Defence Helicopter Flying School at RAF Shawbury)
 Members of C Flight, No. 22 Squadron (at RAF Valley in Anglesey), including Wing Commander Steven Bentley, Wing Commander Iain Wright, Squadron Leader Paul Bolton, Squadron Leader David Taylor, Flight Lieutenant Thomas Bunn, Flight Lieutenant Al Conner, Sergeant Keith Best, with wives."Royal Wedding: Prince William had to fill in application forms for honeymoon leave" - website The Telegraph

Religious figures
Aga Khan IV
Rabbi Anthony Bayfield (President of the Movement for Reform Judaism)
Anil Bhanot (General Secretary of the Hindu Council UK)
Seán Cardinal Brady (Irish Roman Catholic Archbishop of Armagh)
Avinash Patra (Indology Writer of the University of Oxford)
David Chillingworth (Primus of the Scottish Episcopal Church and Bishop of St Andrews, Dunkeld and Dunblane)
John Christie (Moderator of the General Assembly of the Church of Scotland)
 Malcolm Deboo (President of the Zoroastrian Trust Funds of Europe)
 Archbishop  (Eastern Orthodox Archbishop of Thyateira and Great Britain)
Norman Hamilton (Moderator of the Presbyterian Church in Ireland)
Alan Harper (Church of Ireland's Archbishop of Armagh and Primate of All Ireland)
 Gareth Morgan Jones (President of the Free Church Council of Wales)
Monsignor Philip Kerr (Convener of Action of Churches Together in Scotland)
 Commissioner Elizabeth Matear (Salvation Army)
Barry Morgan (Church in Wales' Archbishop of Wales)
Cormac Cardinal Murphy-O'Connor (Roman Catholic Archbishop Emeritus of Westminster)
Vincent Nichols (Roman Catholic Archbishop of Westminster)
Keith Cardinal O'Brien (Roman Catholic Archbishop of St. Andrews and Edinburgh)
 Rabbi Alan Plancey 
Imam Mohammad Raza
Chief Rabbi The Lord Sacks (Chief Rabbi of the United Hebrew Congregations of the Commonwealth)
Bogoda Seelawimala Nayaka Thera (Head Priest of the London Buddhist Vihara)
John Sentamu (Church of England's Archbishop of York) and Margaret Sentamu
 Maulana Syed Raza Shabbarm (Muhammadi Trust)
 Natubhai Shah (President of the Jain Academy)
Indarjit Singh (Director of the Network of Sikh Organisations (UK))
Canon Christopher Tuckwell (Dean of Westminster Cathedral)
 Rev. Martin Turner 
Rowan Williams (Church of England's Archbishop of Canterbury)

Friends of Prince William and Catherine Middleton
 Isabella Anstruther-Gough-Calthorpe (friend of Prince William)
 Helen Asprey (the couple's personal private secretary)
 Oliver Baker (friend of Prince William's from university)
 Emily Bevan (friend of Middleton's from university)  
 Sir Francis Paxton & Lady Allegra Paxton (family friend of Prince William)
 Tim Billington (horse breeder)
 Olivia Bleasdale (friend of Prince William's from university; former flatmate at university)
 Fergus Boyd (friend of Prince William's from university) and wife, Rosie
Tom Bradby (ITN political editor) and Claudia Bradby (a jewellery designer who worked with Middleton at Jigsaw)
Sir Richard Branson (who offered his Caribbean retreat, Necker Island, as a venue for the royal honeymoon) and Lady Branson, and their daughter, Dr Holly Branson.
 Sam Branson (a former friend of Middleton's) was not invited, although his parents and sister did attend.''
 Amanda Bush (friend of Prince William's)
 Sir Henry Cheape (owner of the Strathtyrum estate in St. Andrews where the couple shared a farmhouse)
 Alasdair Coutts-Wood (friend of Prince William's from St. Andrews)
 Jessica 'Jecca' Craig (with Captain Philip Kaye; friends of Prince William's)
 Edward and Lady Tamara van Cutsem (family friends since the Prince's childhood; her mother, the Duchess of Westminster, is the Prince's godmother)
 Hugh and Rose van Cutsem (parents of bridesmaid Grace van Cutsem; Hugh van Cutsem has been a family friend since the Prince's childhood)
 Major Nicholas van Cutsem (family friend since the Prince's childhood) and wife, Alice
 William van Cutsem (friend of Prince William's)
 Bryony Daniels (friend of Prince William's from St. Andrews) 
Chelsy Davy (friend of Prince Harry's)
 Davina Duckworth-Chad (friend of Prince William's) with her husband, Tom Barber
 David Dugmore and Roger Dugmore (safari park owners from Botswana)
 Rupert Finch (friend of Middleton's) and Lady Natasha Rufus Isaacs
Ben Fogle (TV presenter) and his wife, Marina Fogle
 Alicia Fox-Pitt (sister of William Fox-Pitt; Middleton's friend)
 Virginia Fraser (neighbour of the couple's while at St Andrews)
 Astrid Harbord (friend of Prince Harry's)
 Oliver Hicks (friend of Prince William's), and his parents, Charles and Virginia Hicks
 Olivia Hunt (friend of Prince William's), and her parents
 David Jardine-Paterson and Emilia d'Erlanger (banking heir, Prince William's friend; the couple attended their wedding last year)
 James Jardine-Paterson (banking heir; Prince William's friend)
 Arthur Landon (friend of Prince William's), son of late Sir James Timothy Whittington Landon with his mother, Katalin, Lady Landon, born Princess Esterhazy de Galantha
 Tiggy Legge-Bourke (former nanny to Prince William) and Charles Pettifer
Captain Jack Mann (polo player; friend of Prince William's)
 Lady Laura Marsham, daughter of the 8th Earl of Romney, with her brother, Hon. Michael Marsham
 Willem Marx (friend of Middleton's)
 Harry Meade (Old Etonian; friend of the couple's) and Rosie Meade, along with his brother James, sister Lucy and their parents, Olympic gold medallist Richard Meade and Angela Meade
 Natalie Milbank (friend of the couple's) and Edward Milbank
 Drummond Money-Coutts (Magic Circle member) 
 Torquil Montague-Johnstone and Irena Montague-Johnstone (friends of the Middleton family)
 Jake Mulley (friend of Prince William's)
 James Murray Wells (entrepreneur; Old Harrovian)
 Arabella Musgrave (friend of Prince William's)
 Hinesh Parmar (friend of the bride and groom)
 Guy Pelly (friend of Prince William's), with his parents, John Pelly and Vanda Pelly (born Vanda J. Allfrey)
 Earl Percy, Lord Max Percy, Lady Melissa Percy, and Lady Catherine Valentine (the children of Ralph Percy, 12th Duke of Northumberland)
 Shriman Maharaj Sahib Shri Raghav Raj Singh Shisodia, 8th Maharaj Sahib of Shivrati (friend of Prince William's) and his wife Shailja
 Daniel Snow (historian/television presenter) and Lady Edwina Snow (her mother, the Duchess of Westminster, is the Prince's godmother)
 Thomas van Straubenzee (friend of Prince William's since prep school)
 Luke and Mark Tomlinson (friends of Prince William's) with fiancée, Laura Bechtolsheimer
 Ben Vestey (polo player), his wife Chloe and his sister Tamara (friends of Prince William's)
Sam Waley-Cohen (English jockey, and childhood friend of Prince William's) with his fiancée, Annabel Ballin, and his parents, Robert and Felicity Waley-Cohen
 John and Lady Carolyn Warren (the Queen's racing manager and his wife, daughter of the Queen's former racing manager, the Earl of Carnarvon)
 Susanna and Jake Warren (children of John and Lady Carolyn Warren)
 Sir Eric and Lady Anderson, Former Provost of Eton and Charles's teacher at Gordonstoun; Sir Eric advised Prince William on his gap year.
 John Haley (landlord of the local village pub in Bucklebury, frequented by the couple)
 Hash Shingadia (shopkeeper at a local grocery store in Bucklebury, frequented by the couple) and his wife
 Ryan Naylor (the Middleton family's mailman)
 Martin and Sue Fidler (the Middleton family's butchers)

Celebrities and other notable guests
 Gregory Allen (yoga teacher)
 Brian Alexander (Managing Director of The Mustique Company)
Joseph Allbritton (former owner of Riggs Bank)
Rowan Atkinson and wife, Sunetra
David and Victoria Beckham
Amanda Berry (Chief Executive of BAFTA)
 Sir Trevor Brooking
The Viscount Bridport
 Sir Yogendra Pasupalati (Mustique-based physician)
 Butrint R Gashi (Executive, The Mustique Company)
 Basil Charles (owner of Basil's Bar, Mustique)
 Manuel Colonques (Chairman of Porcelanosa)
 The Dowager Duchess of Devonshire
 The Duke and Duchess of Devonshire, friends of the Royal Family
 Marquess Vittorio Frescobaldi (wine industrialist and head of the Italian Frescobaldi noble family)
 Andrew Gailey (Vice-Provost of Eton College, who was Prince William's Housemaster)
Rear Admiral Sir Donald Gosling (co-founder National Car Parks) with Gabriella Di Nora (Diana, Princess of Wales' former personal shopper)
 Edward Gould (Master of Marlborough College between 1993 and 2003)
Amy Huberman (Irish actress)
 Sir Elton John and David Furnish
Count Tibor Kálnoky de Kőröspatak (Hungarian nobleman and landlord who manages Prince Charles's properties in Transylvania)
 Timur Kuanyshev (Kazakh industrialist) and Alfiya Kuanysheva
 Sir John Madejski (Chairman of Reading Football Club)
 Hugh Morrison (horse trainer), and Mary Morrison
 Philippa Naylor (designer)
 The Duke and Duchess of Northumberland, old family friends
Lady Catherine Valentine
Earl Percy and his siblings, as old family friends
Lady Melissa Percy
Lord Max Percy
Tara Palmer-Tomkinson (television presenter and socialite)
 Pedro Pesudo (Director of Porcelanosa)
 Juergen Pierburg (art collector and philanthropist) 
The Lord Petre (Lord Lieutenant of Essex)
 Roger Pritchard (Managing Director of The Mustique Company)
Guy Ritchie with Jacqui Ainsley
Lily Safra (Brazilian-Monegasque philanthropist)
Julia Samuel (founder of Child Bereavement UK)
 Richard Schaffer (tennis coach at Mustique) 
 Lucia Santa Cruz (daughter of former Chilean ambassador; friend of Prince Charles's)
Joss Stone
Mario Testino (fashion photographer who took the engagement photos)
Gareth Thomas (Welsh rugby union international)
Ian Thorpe (Australian Olympic gold medalist swimmer)
Matthew Vaughn
Martyn Williams (Welsh rugby player)
Sir Clive and Lady Woodward
Jon Zammett (Head of public relations of the German car manufacturer Audi)
The Duke and Duchess of Westminster
Galen Weston (Canadian businessman)

Maid of Honour and Bridesmaids, Best Man and Page Boys
The groom's father, Charles, Prince of Wales, released the official cadre of bridesmaids, pages and the overall makeup of the wedding party:

Maid of Honour and Best man
Pippa Middleton, the Maid of Honour
Prince Henry of Wales, the Best man

Bridesmaids and Page Boys
 Lady Louise Mountbatten-Windsor, aged 7 – daughter of Prince Edward, Earl of Wessex, and Sophie, Countess of Wessex
 The Hon. Margarita Armstrong-Jones, aged 8 – daughter of Viscount and Viscountess Linley
 Grace van Cutsem, aged 3 – goddaughter of Prince William and daughter of Hugh Ralph van Cutsem and his wife, Rose van Cutsem (born Rose Nancy Langhorne Astor)
 Eliza Lopes, aged 3 – daughter of Harry Lopes and Laura Lopes (born Laura Rose Parker Bowles), and granddaughter of Camilla, Duchess of Cornwall
 William Lowther-Pinkerton, aged 10 – son of Jamie Lowther-Pinkerton and his wife, Susannah Lowther-Pinkerton (born Susannah Lucy Richards)
 Thomas Pettifer, aged 8 – godson of Prince William and son of Charles Pettifer and Tiggy Legge-Bourke

Notable people who declined their invitations
The following are notable people who declined their invitations for various reasons:
  Stephen Harper (Prime Minister of Canada) and his wife Laureen Harper – the wedding day was three days before the Canadian federal elections.
  Grand Chief Sir Michael Somare (Prime Minister of Papua New Guinea) and Lady Somare – Michael  Somare was recovering from surgery.
  The Baroness Thatcher (Former Prime Minister of the United Kingdom 1979–1990) – declined due to ill health.
  The King and Queen of Jordan – declined due to the protests in their country.
  The Queen of the Netherlands – declined due to her nation's observance of Queen's Day, which is the day after.
  The King of the Belgians and Queen Paola – because of the beatification ceremony for Pope John Paul II
  The King of Spain – could not attend as he was recovering from surgery; was represented by his wife.
  The King of Sweden – declined due to his own birthday celebrations which took place the day after.
  The King of Cambodia
  The Hereditary Prince of Liechtenstein – because of the beatification ceremony for Pope John Paul II.
  The Crown Prince of Bahrain – declined due to the ensuing protests in that country.
  The Crown Prince and Crown Princess of Japan – declined due to the earthquake and tsunami that devastated their country.
  Dean Barrow (Prime Minister of Belize) 
  Richie McCaw (New Zealand national rugby union captain) – declined due to commitments to his Super Rugby club, the Crusaders.
  Brian O'Driscoll (Ireland national rugby union captain and husband of invitee, actress Amy Huberman) – declined due to commitments to his club team, Leinster, who were to play a Heineken Cup semi-final against Toulouse the day after the wedding.
  The Duke and Duchess of Norfolk – declined due to the announcement of their separation.

Invitation withdrawn
  Sami Khiyami (Syrian ambassador to the United Kingdom)

See also
List of wedding guests of Charles, Prince of Wales, and Lady Diana Spencer (1981)
List of wedding guests of Victoria, Crown Princess of Sweden, and Daniel Westling (2010)
List of wedding guests of Prince Harry and Meghan Markle (2018)

References

External links
Selected Guest List from the official Royal Wedding 2011 website

Wedding ceremony participants
2011 in England
Wedding
William, Prince of Wales
Wedding of Prince William and Catherine Middleton